Glasgow Village is a census-designated place (CDP) in St. Louis County, Missouri, United States. The population was 5,429 at the 2010 census.

Geography
Glasgow Village is located at  (38.756049, -90.199437).

Demographics

At the 2000 census there were 5,234 people, 1,888 households, and 1,406 families in the CDP. The racial makeup of the CDP was 56.90% White, 41.06% African American, 0.06% Native American, 0.36% Asian, 0.02% Pacific Islander, 0.31% from other races, and 1.30% from two or more races. Hispanic or Latino of any race were 1.11%.

Of the 1,888 households 41.2% had children under the age of 18 living with them, 43.6% were married couples living together, 26.4% had a female householder with no husband present, and 25.5% were non-families. 22.3% of households were one person and 11.6% were one person aged 65 or older. The average household size was 2.77 and the average family size was 3.23.

The age distribution was 33.7% under the age of 18, 8.2% from 18 to 24, 29.0% from 25 to 44, 14.4% from 45 to 64, and 14.7% 65 or older. The median age was 31 years. For every 100 females, there were 86.0 males. For every 100 females age 18 and over, there were 78.5 males.

The median household income was $36,213 and the median family income  was $39,795. Males had a median income of $34,211 versus $27,318 for females. The per capita income for the CDP was $17,667. About 12.6% of families and 13.0% of the population were below the poverty line, including 23.3% of those under age 18 and 2.6% of those age 65 or over.

References

Census-designated places in St. Louis County, Missouri
Missouri populated places on the Mississippi River
Census-designated places in Missouri